The 2003 Blackpool Borough Council election took place on 1 May 2003 to elect members of the Unitary Blackpool Borough Council in England. The Labour Party kept its overall majority and continued to run the council. Boundary changes had taken place since the last election in 2000 which reduced the number of seats by two. Overall turnout was 50.43%.

Results

Ward results

Anchorsholme

Bispham

Bloomfield

Brunswick

Claremont

Clifton

Greenlands

Hawes Side

Highfield

Ingthorpe

Layton

Marton

Norbreck

Park

Squires Gate

Stanley

Talbot

Tyldesley

Victoria

Warbreck

Waterloo

References

2003 English local elections
2003
2000s in Lancashire